L'Hôpital's rule or l'Hospital's rule, also known as Bernoulli's rule, is a mathematical theorem that allows evaluating limits of indeterminate forms using derivatives. Application (or repeated application) of the rule often converts an indeterminate form to an expression that can be easily evaluated by substitution. The rule is named after the 17th-century French mathematician Guillaume de l'Hôpital. Although the rule is often attributed to l'Hôpital, the theorem was first introduced to him in 1694 by the Swiss mathematician Johann Bernoulli.

The differentiation of the numerator and denominator often simplifies the quotient or converts it to a limit that can be evaluated directly.

History 
Guillaume de l'Hôpital (also written l'Hospital) published this rule in his 1696 book Analyse des Infiniment Petits pour l'Intelligence des Lignes Courbes (literal translation: Analysis of the Infinitely Small for the Understanding of Curved Lines), the first textbook on differential calculus. However, it is believed that the rule was discovered by the Swiss mathematician Johann Bernoulli.

General form 
The general form of L'Hôpital's rule covers many cases. Let  and  be extended real numbers (i.e., real numbers, positive infinity, or negative infinity). Let  be an open interval containing  (for a two-sided limit) or an open interval with endpoint  (for a one-sided limit, or a limit at infinity if  is infinite).

In the second case, the hypothesis that  diverges to infinity is not used in the proof (see note at the end of the proof section); thus, while the conditions of the rule are normally stated as above, the second sufficient condition for the rule's procedure to be valid can be more briefly stated as 

The hypothesis that  appears most commonly in the literature, but some authors sidestep this hypothesis by adding other hypotheses elsewhere. Another method is to require that both  and  be differentiable everywhere on an interval containing .

Cases where theorem cannot be applied (Necessity of conditions) 

All four conditions for L'Hôpital's rule are necessary:

 Existence of limit of the quotient of the derivatives:  exists.

Where one of the above conditions is not satisfied, L'Hôpital's rule is not valid in general, and so it cannot always be applied.

Form is not indeterminate 

This means that the form is not indeterminate.

But, L'Hôpital's rule fails in this counterexample, since .

Differentiability of functions 
The fact that  is an open interval is grandfathered in from the hypothesis of the Cauchy Mean Value Theorem.

However, since  is differentiable everywhere except , then  still exists. Thus, since 

 and  exists, L'Hôpital's rule still holds.

Derivative of denominator is zero 
The necessity of the condition that  near  can be seen by the following counterexample due to Otto Stolz.

Further examples of this type were found by Ralph P. Boas Jr.

Limit of derivatives does not exist 
The requirement that the limit

exists is essential. Without this condition,  or  may exhibit undamped oscillations as  approaches , in which case L'Hôpital's rule does not apply.

But working with the original functions,  can be shown to exist:

In a case such as this, all that can be concluded is that

 

so that if the limit of f/g exists, then it must lie between the inferior and superior limits of f′/g′.  (In the example above, this is true, since 1 indeed lies between 0 and 2.)

Examples
 Here is a basic example involving the exponential function, which involves the indeterminate form  at : 
 This is a more elaborate example involving . Applying L'Hôpital's rule a single time still results in an indeterminate form. In this case, the limit may be evaluated by applying the rule three times: 
 Here is an example involving :  Repeatedly apply L'Hôpital's rule until the exponent is zero (if  is an integer) or negative (if  is fractional) to conclude that the limit is zero.
 Here is an example involving the indeterminate form  (see below), which is rewritten as the form : 
Let  be the principal (loan amount),  the interest rate per period and  the number of periods.
 One can also use L'Hôpital's rule to prove the following theorem.
Then: and so,  exists and </p>The result remains true without the added hypothesis that  converges to positive or negative infinity, but the justification is then incomplete.

Complications 
Sometimes L'Hôpital's rule does not lead to an answer in a finite number of steps unless some additional steps are applied. Examples include the following:

An arbitrarily large number of applications may never lead to an answer even without repeating:This situation too can be dealt with by a transformation of variables, in this case :  Again, an alternative approach is to multiply numerator and denominator by  before applying L'Hôpital's rule: 

A common pitfall is using L'Hôpital's rule with some circular reasoning to compute a derivative via a difference quotient. For example, consider the task of proving the derivative formula for powers of x:

 as expected. However, differentiating the numerator requires the use of the very fact that is being proven.  This is an example of begging the question, since one may not assume the fact to be proven during the course of the proof. 

A similar pitfall occurs in the calculation of  Proving that differentiating  gives  involves calculating the difference quotient  in the first place, so a different method such as squeeze theorem must be used instead.

Other indeterminate forms 
For example, to evaluate a limit involving , convert the difference of two functions to a quotient:

where L'Hôpital's rule is applied when going from (1) to (2) and again when going from (3) to (4).

L'Hôpital's rule can be used on indeterminate forms involving exponents by using logarithms to "move the exponent down". Here is an example involving the indeterminate form :

It is valid to move the limit inside the exponential function because the exponential function is continuous. Now the exponent  has been "moved down". The limit  is of the indeterminate form , but as shown in an example above, l'Hôpital's rule may be used to determine that

Thus

The following table lists the most common indeterminate forms, and the transformations for applying l'Hôpital's rule:

Stolz–Cesàro theorem 

The Stolz–Cesàro theorem is a similar result involving limits of sequences, but it uses finite difference operators rather than derivatives.

Geometric interpretation 
Suppose . L'Hôpital's rule then states that the slope of the curve when  is the limit of the slope of the tangent to the curve as the curve approaches the origin, provided that this is defined.

Proof of L'Hôpital's rule

Special case
It is not a proof of the general L'Hôpital's rule because it is stricter in its definition, requiring both differentiability and that c be a real number. Since many common functions have continuous derivatives (e.g. polynomials, sine and cosine, exponential functions), it is a special case worthy of attention.

Then

 

This follows from the difference-quotient definition of the derivative. The limit in the conclusion is not indeterminate because .

The proof of a more general version of L'Hôpital's rule is given below.

General proof

Let f and g be functions satisfying the hypotheses in the General form section. Let  be the open interval in the hypothesis with endpoint c.

(The symbols inf and sup denote the infimum and supremum.)

Consequently,  for all choices of distinct x and y in the interval. The value g(x)-g(y) is always nonzero for distinct x and y in the interval, for if it was not, the mean value theorem would imply the existence of a p between x and y such that g' (p)=0.

The definition of m(x) and M(x) will result in an extended real number, and so it is possible for them to take on the values ±∞.  In the following two cases, m(x) and M(x) will establish bounds on the ratio .

Case 1: 

For any x in the interval , and point y between x and c,

and therefore as y approaches c,  and  become zero, and so

Case 2: 

For every x in the interval , define . For every point y between x and c,
 

As y approaches c, both  and  become zero, and therefore
 

The limit superior and limit inferior are necessary since the existence of the limit of  has not yet been established.

It is also the case that 

and
 and 

In case 1, the squeeze theorem establishes that  exists and is equal to L. In the case 2, and the squeeze theorem again asserts that , and so the limit  exists and is equal to L. This is the result that was to be proven.

In case 2 the assumption that f(x) diverges to infinity was not used within the proof. This means that if |g(x)| diverges to infinity as x approaches c and both f and g satisfy the hypotheses of L'Hôpital's rule, then no additional assumption is needed about the limit of f(x): It could even be the case that the limit of f(x) does not exist. In this case, L'Hopital's theorem is actually a consequence of Cesàro–Stolz.

In the case when |g(x)| diverges to infinity as x approaches c and f(x) converges to a finite limit at c, then L'Hôpital's rule would be applicable, but not absolutely necessary, since basic limit calculus will show that the limit of f(x)/g(x) as x approaches c must be zero.

Corollary 
A simple but very useful consequence of L'Hopital's rule is a well-known criterion for differentiability. It states the following:
Suppose, moreover, that  exists. Then  also exists and

In particular, f''' is also continuous at a.

Proof
The continuity of f at a'' tells us that . Moreover,  since a polynomial function is always continuous everywhere. Applying L'Hopital's rule shows that .

See also 
 L'Hôpital controversy

Notes

References

Sources 

Articles containing proofs
Theorems in calculus
Theorems in real analysis
Limits (mathematics)